Bill Simpson (1940–2019) was an American racecar driver.

Bill Simpson may also refer to:

Bill Simpson (actor) (1931–1986), Scottish  actor
Bill Simpson (American football) (born 1951), American football defensive backer fl. 1974–1982
Billy Simpson (footballer, born 1929) (1929–2017), Northern Ireland international football player
Billy Simpson (footballer, born 1907)
Billy Simpson (footballer, born 1878) (1878–1962), English football player for Sunderland and Lincoln City
Billy Simpson (jockey) (c. 1840–1873), South Australian jockey
Billy Simpson (singer) (born 1987), Indonesian singer-songwriter

See also
William Simpson (disambiguation)
Will Simpson (disambiguation)